American entertainer Cher has released 83 official singles, 20 promotional singles and appeared in 25 other songs. On the Billboard Hot 100, she has achieved: 4 number 1 singles, 12 Top 10 singles, 22 Top 40 singles and a total of 33 charted singles as a solo artist. Combined with the entries she had as part of Sonny & Cher: 5 number 1 singles, 17 Top 10 singles, 32 Top 40 hits and a total of 51 singles which charted on the Billboard Hot 100.

Cher is the fifth-ranked female artist with the most Billboard US Hot 100 charted singles. She has reached the Top 10 on the Hot 100 at least once during each of four decades—the 1960s, 1970s, 1980s and 1990s—placing her in a tie for second place in that category as of May 2014, alongside Aerosmith, Barbra Streisand, Madonna and Whitney Houston, only behind Michael Jackson. Cher's span of top 10 records on the Hot 100 stretches for a total of 33 years, one month and three weeks (not counting the Sonny and Cher hits "I Got You Babe" and "Baby Don't Go"), from "Bang Bang" in 1966 to "Believe" in 1999, placing her in third place in that category as of May 2014, behind only Jackson and Carlos Santana.

Cher's career as a recording artist spans seven decades and she is the only artist to have a number-one single on a Billboard chart in each of the past six decades. This feat was accomplished when "You Haven't Seen the Last of Me" reached number one on the Hot Dance Music/Club Play chart the week of January 19, 2011.

In the UK, she is the only female artist to have a top 40 hit in six consecutive decades. She has had a total of 34 top 40 hits, beginning with "All I Really Want to Do" in 1965 through "I Hope You Find It" in 2013.

Cher's Spanish version of "Chiquitita" became her first song to chart on a US Latin chart, reaching number six on the US Billboard Latin Digital Songs chart. In October 2020, Cher released her version of "Happiness Is Just a Thing Called Joe" as a promotional single in her support of the US president candidate Joe Biden. In November 2020, Cher was one of the artists featured on a cover of Oasis' "Stop Crying Your Heart Out", recorded as a charity single for BBC's Children in Need.

In May 2021, Cher released "Walls", a song originally recorded for her Free the Wild Foundation in 2017, as a single from her "Cher and the Loneliest Elephant" documentary.

Singles

1960s

1970s

1980s

1990s

2000s

2010s

2020s

Promotional or limited releases

Other appearances

Notes
A  "Mama (When My Dollies Have Babies)" did not enter the Billboard Hot 100 but peaked on the Bubbling Under Hot 100 Singles chart at number 24.
B  "For What It's Worth" did not enter the Billboard Hot 100 but peaked on the Bubbling Under Hot 100 Singles chart at number 25.
C  "Am I Blue?" did not enter the Billboard Hot 100 but peaked on the Bubbling Under Hot 100 Singles chart at number 11.
D  "I Got You Babe" duet with Beavis and Butt-head did not enter the Billboard Hot 100 but peaked on the Bubbling Under Hot 100 Singles chart at number 8.
E  "Woman's World" did not enter the Billboard Hot 100 but peaked on the Bubbling Under Hot 100 Singles chart at number 25.
F  "Gimme! Gimme! Gimme! (A Man After Midnight)" did not enter the ARIA Singles Chart, but peaked at number 40 on the ARIA Digital Tracks Chart.
G  "Gimme! Gimme! Gimme! (A Man After Midnight)" did not enter the UK Singles Chart, but peaked at number 34 on the UK Downloads Chart.
H  "SOS" did not enter the UK Singles Chart, but peaked at number 78 on the UK Downloads Chart.

See also
 Cher albums discography
 Sonny & Cher discography
 List of artists who reached number one in the United States
 List of number-one dance hits (United States)
 List of artists by total number of UK number-one singles
 List of artists who reached number one on the U.S. dance chart

References

External links
[ Cher Overview] Allmusic

Discographies of American artists
Pop music discographies

es:Anexo:Discografía de Cher
hu:Cher kislemezei
ru:Дискография Шер